Bon Aqua is an unincorporated community in Hickman County, Tennessee, United States. Bon Aqua has a post office with ZIP code 37025, which opened on March 5, 1842.

The community was named for the "good water" of a nearby mineral spring. Remnants of the former mineral springs resort are preserved as the Bon Aqua Springs Historic District, listed on the National Register of Historic Places.

Phillip Van Horn Weems was a major of the 11th Tennessee, he owned Bon Aqua Springs before the war, Weems was killed in the Battle of Atlanta and in the 1880s was exhumed from the CS cemetery in Griffin, GA, and brought back in a vinegar barrel by wagon and buried in the family cemetery located at the end of Weems Cemetery road near Bon Aqua Springs.

Country Music legend Johnny Cash had owned Weems' old farmhouse for over three decades, and The Storytellers Museum, which converted from a general store and recording studio that Johnny Cash used as a place for local concerts, has now become a new landmark of Bon Aqua.

References

Unincorporated communities in Hickman County, Tennessee
Unincorporated communities in Tennessee